The Big Ten Academic Alliance (BTAA), formerly the Committee on Institutional Cooperation (CIC), is the academic consortium of the universities in the Big Ten Conference. The consortium was renamed on June 29, 2016.

Member universities 

The Big Ten Academic Alliance is an academic consortium of the 14 institutions that are members of the Big Ten Conference. The University of Chicago, a former Big Ten Conference member, was a member of the CIC from 1958 to June 29, 2016.

Current members:
 Indiana University Bloomington
 Michigan State University
 Northwestern University
 Ohio State University
 Pennsylvania State University
 Purdue University
 Rutgers University–New Brunswick
 University of Illinois Urbana–Champaign
 University of Iowa
 University of Maryland, College Park
 University of Michigan
 University of Minnesota, Twin Cities
 University of Nebraska–Lincoln
 University of Wisconsin–Madison

History 
The Committee on Institutional Cooperation was established by the presidents of the Big Ten members in 1958 as the conference's academic counterpart. An invitation extended to the University of Chicago, one of the founding members of the Big Ten who withdrew from the conference in 1946, was accepted.

Following its admittance to the Big Ten in 1990, the CIC invited Pennsylvania State University to join the consortium. The University of Nebraska–Lincoln also joined the consortium in 2011 following the school's admittance to the Big Ten.

The University of Maryland and Rutgers University, who joined the Big Ten in 2014, joined the consortium on July 1, 2013.

On June 29, 2016, the name of the consortium was changed from "Committee on Institutional Cooperation" to "Big Ten Academic Alliance". The University of Chicago, a former Big Ten Conference member and former member of the CIC, is not a member of the rebranded consortium, but continues to participate in programs through an affiliation agreement.

Statistics 
When considered collectively, BTAA universities educate over 605,000 students, including approximately 400,000 full-time undergraduate students and over 100,000 full-time graduate students. BTAA universities award 29% of all agriculture Ph.D.s, 18% of engineering Ph.D.s, and 18% of humanities Ph.D.s in the United States annually.

BTAA members, when viewed collectively, conducted a combined total of $9.8 billion in funded research and BTAA libraries own over 110 million volumes.

Collectively, BTAA members employ approximately 49,000 instructional staff.

Collaboration 
The BTAA's collaborative efforts span the academic enterprise of its members, including:

cooperative purchasing and licensing
course sharing
professional development programs
library resources
information technology
international collaborations
faculty networking
participant in Google Books Library Project

Cancer Research Consortium 
A related institution to the BTAA, the Big Ten Cancer Research Consortium (BTCRC) unites the cancer research centers of Big Ten universities through collaborative oncology trials. All 14 members of the BTAA are members of the BTCRC, as well as the University of Illinois Chicago (UIC). Member cancer centers are as follows:

 Indiana University Melvin and Bren Simon Comprehensive Cancer Center
 Michigan State University Cancer Research
 Robert H. Laurie Comprehensive Cancer Center of Northwestern University
 Ohio State University Comprehensive Cancer Center – Arthur G. James Cancer Hospital and Richard J. Solove Cancer Research Institute ("The James")
 Penn State Cancer Institute
 Purdue University Center for Cancer Research
 Rutgers Cancer Institute of New Jersey
 University of Illinois Cancer Center (UI Chicago)
 Cancer Center at Illinois (UI Urbana–Champaign)
 University of Iowa Holden Comprehensive Cancer Center
 University of Maryland Marlene and Stewart Greenbaum Comprehensive Cancer Center
 University of Michigan Rogel Cancer Center
 Masonic Cancer Center (University of Minnesota)
 Fred & Pamela Buffett Cancer Center (University of Nebraska)
 University of Wisconsin Carbone Cancer Center

References

External links 
 The Big Ten Academic Alliance

College and university associations and consortia in the United States
1958 establishments in Illinois